Dave Chaytors (born October 12, 1969) is a former Canadian football defensive lineman in the Canadian Football League who played for the Ottawa Rough Riders and BC Lions. He played college football for the Utah Utes.

Steroid Use
In a post-game interview in October 1996, Doug Flutie of the Toronto Argonauts insinuated that certain Lions players, including Chaytors, were using steroids. In response, Chaytors admitted that he had used the performance-enhancing substance in the past, but ``not right now″ and "not in the CFL".

References

1969 births
Living people
American football defensive linemen
Canadian football defensive linemen
Ottawa Rough Riders players
BC Lions players
Utah Utes football players
Canadian players of American football
Canadian sportspeople in doping cases
Doping cases in American football